Dr. Michel Sidibé (born 1952 in Mali) is the Africa Union Special Envoy for the African Medicines Agency (AMA). He was the Minister of Health and Social Affairs of Mali. A long-standing champion of a people-centered approach to health and development and a strong advocate for social justice, Sidibé was the second Executive Director of UNAIDS, serving from January 2009 until May 2019. He held the rank of Under-Secretary-General.

Background

Dr. Michel Hamala Sidibé was born in Medina Koura (Bamako) to a French mother Jeanne Poitevin and a Malian father, Fode Sidibé. After completing his secondary education in Mali and university degrees in economics, international development, and social planning in France, he began his professional career as the first Country Director of Terre des Hommes France in Mali in the Timbuktu region, working to improve the health and well-being of the nomadic Tuareg populations.

Career

Michel Hamala Sidibé was born in Medina Koura (Bamako). After completing his secondary education in Mali and university degrees in economics, international development, and social planning in France, he began his professional career as the first Country Director of Terre des Hommes France in Mali in the Timbuktu region, working to improve the health and well-being of the nomadic Tuareg populations. In 1982, he formulated and launched the first semi-sedentarization program for the nomadic populations of the Timbuktu region. In 1984, Dr. Sidibe became a founding member of the CCA-ONG, which brings together 111 national and international NGOs working in Mali to coordinate actions in the field and ensure consultation between the NGOs. In 1987, he joined the United Nations Children's Fund (UNICEF) in the Democratic Republic of Congo. As Program Manager, he led the Expanded Program on Immunization (EPI) planning and implementation, designed to cover 30 million people in the country.

During a 14-year career at UNICEF, Michel supervised technical assistance programs to 10 French-speaking countries in the formulation of their national programs. He then served as a Representative in Swaziland, Burundi, and Uganda. He was Chief Negotiator for the ratification of Children's Rights in Swaziland to King Mswati III. In Burundi, he contributed to the lifting of the embargo; he negotiated the creation of a humanitarian corridor for the delivery of vaccines and medicines essential to the survival of the population; he launched with President Buyoya the Temporary Schools Program to ensure the education of children displaced by the war. In Uganda, he was a Negotiator with President Museveni to free Congolese child soldiers and ensure their family reunification in the Congo; He skillfully advocated for the release of young girls abducted by the Lord's Liberation Army; He supported the creation of a psycho-social care center in Northern Uganda. 

In 2001, Michel joined UNAIDS as Country and Regional Support Director. He organized a reform to transform "UNAIDS into a more focused, effective and efficient joint program capable of delivering results at the country level." In 2007, he was appointed Deputy Executive Director of Programs at UNAIDS and Assistant Secretary-General of the United Nations. In 2008, he was appointed Executive Director of UNAIDS. In 2009, he was named by the French newspaper Le Monde as one of the 50 personalities of the year. In 2011 in New York, Michel was part of the formulation and launched with Presidents Clinton and Goodluck of the first Global Plan to Eliminate Mother to Child Transmission of HIV. In 2012, he was named by Africa Report as one of the 50 most influential Africans. In 2016, he was Chief Negotiator with 193 UN countries for the Political Declaration on Ending AIDS by 2030. In 2017, he received the President's Medal from Emory University in Atlanta in recognition of his work as a “passionate advocate for health and humanity.” Past recipients of the President's Medal include President Jimmy Carter, the Dalai Lama, Congressman John Lewis, global health hero William Foege and civil rights activist Rosa Parks.  

In May 2019, he was appointed Minister of Health and Social Affairs in Mali. In 2020, he led the development of the COVID-19 Response Plan budgeted at 55 billion CFA francs, with 60% financed by partners. He has led the development of a new strategy for Action for Health in Mali, whose conceptual framework, similar to a World Health Organization model, was recognized at the global level. He has implemented the creation of the National Agency for Reproductive Health with the mission to focus on maternal and child health.

In 2020, he was appointed Africa Union Special Envoy for the African Medicines Agency (AMA), following the Executive Council decision of February 2021, to lead the global advocacy for the creation of the agency and the mobilization of African Countries to sign and ratify the AMA.

Scandal and resignation
Sidibé offered his resignation from his post as head of UNAIDS following an expert report on sexual harassment in the agency that criticized his "defective leadership." Initially, when allegations surfaced in mid-2018, Sidibé refused to resign. In response to heightened scrutiny and reports of his gross mismanagement, however, Sidibé informed the agency's board on 13 December 2018 that he would leave his post in June 2019.

A panel of independent experts released a report on 13 December 2018 saying Sidibé was overseeing a "patriarchal" workplace and promoting a "cult of personality" centered on him as the all-powerful chief. The experts noted the situation could not be changed unless Sidibé resigned.

Other activities
 International Gender Champions (IGC), Member
 Calouste Gulbenkian Prize for Human Rights, Member of the Jury (since 2017)
. Global Commission on Drug Policy, Board member

References

External link

Living people
1952 births
Recipients of the National Order of Mali
Recipients of the Order of Saint-Charles